The National Patient Safety Goals is a quality and patient safety improvement program established by the Joint Commission in 2003. The NPSGs were established to help accredited organizations address specific areas of concern in regards to patient safety.

References 

Patient safety
Healthcare in the United States